Shivampet or Shivampeta is a Mandal in Sangareddy district of Telangana, India.

References

Mandals in Telangana
Sangareddy district